The Philips Innovation Award is an international student entrepreneur award that is organised annually. The award is presented for students (or recently graduated students) who have transformed an innovative idea into a startup. This award may be presented to an individual or team. Participants of the program receive coaching from diverse partners.

Recipients of the Philips Innovation award receive prizes worth of €50,000. Since 2016 a second category award is initiated called the Rough Diamond Award

Recipients 

 2020: Lalaland (company) (Creates AI-generated models for e-commerce web shops)
 2019: BI/OND (Empowers biologists with hardware solutions for cell-based assays)
 2018: Closure (Handling the digital legacy)
 2017: GBW Works, (Innovation award), Level Diagnostics (Rough Diamond award)
 2016: Ava (App for deaf and hearing impaired people)
 2015: Invi (Bracelet for empowerment against sexual violence)
 2014: Dwillo
 2013: SciSports (sports data)
 2012: aQysta
 2011: Clinical Graphics
 2006: Senz (Storm umbrella)

References

External links 
 Philips Innovation Award page
 Philips Innovation Award former winners page

Innovation
Entrepreneurship organizations
Business and industry awards